This is a list of United States Navy aircraft wings. The U.S. Navy operates Carrier Air Wings which are operational units made up of squadrons of different types of aircraft that deploy aboard aircraft carriers. In addition to its Carrier Air Wings the Navy operates various land based wings. These land based wings are organized either to perform a specific function (Functional Wings) or around a specific aircraft type/model (Type Wings). Patrol and Reconnaissance Wings, Test Wings and Training Wings are examples of functional wings, these wings may consist of a single type of aircraft or of a variety of types needed to perform the wing's specific function. Type Wings consist of squadrons of a single type/model of aircraft, they are non-deploying "force providers" that provide combat ready squadrons or detachments to deploying Carrier Air Wings or to other Navy or joint forces. All Navy aircraft wings are commanded by a Navy Captain though the commander of a Training Air Wing or a Naval Test Wing could be a Marine Colonel.

Carrier Air Wings (CVW)
See Carrier air wingThere have been a total of 133 Carrier Air Wings (called Carrier Air Groups prior to 20 December 1963) dating back to 1 July 1938 when the first five were established, two of which still exist today. A further two were established prior to the United States' entry into WWII on 7 December 1941 and 86 more were established during the war, of which four still exist today. During the course of a wing's existence it could be identified by multiple different designations. For example, there are two wings that exist today which have been identified by five different designations during the course of their existence. 

A wing/group exists separately from its designation and a single designation could be used to identify multiple different wings/groups at different points in time. For example there were three carrier air groups which were designated CVG-15 at some point in each of their existence and none of those three groups were related to each other. The first was a WWII Carrier Air Group which existed as CVG-15 from 1 Sep 1942 to 30 Oct 1945. The second was a Carrier Air Group which was established in 1945 as CVG-153, redesignated CVAG-15 on 15 November 1946, then redesignated CVG-15 on 1 September 1948 and disestablished on 1 December 1949. The third was established as CVG-15 on 5 April 1951 then redesignated Carrier Air Wing (CVW)-15 on 20 December 1963 and disestablished on 31 March 1995.

The tables which follow are arranged by time periods using the designation scheme which was in use during that time period so a single group/wing will appear in multiple tables below. Of the 133 total wings which have ever existed, 100 have been identified by a single designation, 17 have been identified by two designations, seven by three designations, six by four designations and three by five designations.

Currently Active Carrier Air Wings 
Carrier Air Wings were first established on 1 July 1938 when the aircraft squadrons assigned to the aircraft carriers USS Lexington (CV 2), USS Saratoga (CV 3), USS Ranger (CV 4), USS Yorktown (CV 5) and USS Enterprise (CV 6) were established as "Carrier Air Groups" assigned to each of those ships. Two of those Carrier Air Groups are still active today as Carrier Air Wings ONE and THREE. On 20 December 1963 all Carrier Air Groups which were then in existence were redesignated Carrier Air Wings (CVW).

 Tail codes with a first letter "A" denote Atlantic Fleet airwings, while "N" denotes Pacific Fleet airwings.

Disestablished Carrier Air Wings 
The "Carrier Air Wing (CVW)" designation was first used on 20 December 1963. Prior to that date "Carrier Air Wings" were titled "Carrier Air Groups". This section contains tables of disestablished Carrier Air Groups (Ship Named Groups, CVG, CVLG, CVEG, CVBG, CVAG, CVSG), Air Task Groups (ATG) and Carrier Air Wings (CVW).

Ship named Carrier Air Groups
Aircraft squadrons operating from the Navy's first Aircraft Carriers prior to WWII were assigned to that aircraft carrier and were organizationally grouped into that carrier's "air group". On 1 July 1938 the "Carrier Air Group" was formally established as a separate unit and the previously informally named air groups were titled "name of ship Air Group". Air Groups were permanently assigned to a specific Aircraft Carrier and carried that Aircraft Carrier's name (Lexington Air Group, Saratoga Air Group etc...)

Carrier Air Groups (CVG, CVLG, CVEG, CVBG) of WWII to 15 Nov 1946
In 1942 in anticipation of the coming massive build up of aircraft carriers and carrier air groups a new Carrier Air Group designation scheme was created which divorced carrier air groups from specific aircraft carriers by designating air groups with the designation "CVG" followed by a number in favor of naming air groups with aircraft carrier names. All newly establishing carrier air groups were designated under this system and in 1943 the two remaining ship named air groups; Saratoga Air Group and Ranger Air Group were redesignated CVG-3 and CVG-4 respectively.Note: the parenthetical (1st), (2nd), (3rd) appended to some Carrier Air Group designations below are not a part of the Group's designation. They are added to indicate that the designation was used more than one time during the history of U.S. Naval Aviation and to specify which use of the designation is indicated.  There is not necessarily any connection between Carrier Air Groups which shared the same designation.

Carrier Air Groups (CVAG, CVBG, CVLG, CVEG) 15 Nov 1946 to 1 Sep 1948

Carrier Air Groups (CVG) 1 Sep 1948 to 20 Dec 1963
Note: the parenthetical (1st), (2nd), (3rd) appended to some Carrier Air Group designations below are not a part of the Group's designation. They are added to indicate that the designation was used more than one time during the history of U.S. Naval Aviation and to specify which use of the designation is indicated.  There is not necessarily any connection between Carrier Air Groups which shared the same designation.

Air Task Groups (ATG) 1 Aug 1950 to 19 Jan 1959
Air Task Groups were formed beginning in 1951 to address a shortage of Carrier Air Groups (CVG)s due to involvement in the Korean War. The number of CVGs was statutorily limited but the Navy needed more of them. The solution was to form "temporary" task groups by reassigning some squadrons from existing CVGs and using them to form an "Air Task Group" (ATG). This reduced the number of squadrons in those CVGs from the then typical five total VF/VA squadrons to four total VF/VA squadrons but gave the Navy more "CVGs". They were carrier air group (CVG) equivalents in every respect but in name but as "temporary" units they were neither formerly "established" or "disestablished" instead they were "formed" and "disbanded." Though the ATG was created in response to the Korean War, they ended up outlasting that conflict.

 Tail codes with a first letter "A" denote Atlantic Fleet Air Task Groups, while "N" denotes Pacific Fleet Air Task Groups.

Antisubmarine Carrier Air Groups (CVSG) 1 Apr 1960 to 30 Jul 1975
In the 1960s some WWII Essex class aircraft carriers were designated as "Anti-Submarine Carriers" (CVS) and were paired with newly established "Anti-Submarine Carrier Air Groups" (CVSG). CVSGs consisted of Helicopter Antisubmarine (HS) squadrons of SH-3 Sea Kings and Air Antisubmarine (VS) squadrons of S-2 Trackers along with a detachment of airborne early warning E-1 Tracers from Airborne Early Warning (VAW) squadrons and a detachment A-4 Skyhawks for self defense. There were two active and two reserve Anti-Submarine Fighter (VSF) squadrons established for this role but most of the A-4 dets were sourced from Navy or USMC attack (VA/VMA) squadrons. The CVSGs were not included in the redesignation of Carrier Air Groups (CVG)s to Carrier Air Wings (CVW)s in 1963 and therefore they were the last "Carrier Air Groups" to exist in the U.S. Navy.

 Tail codes with a first letter "A" denoted Atlantic Fleet air groups, while "N" denoted Pacific Fleet air groups.

Carrier Air Wings (CVW) 20 Dec 1963 to present
On 20 December 1963 all Carrier Air Groups (CVG) then in existence (but not the Anti-Submarine Carrier Air Groups (CVSG)) were redesignated to Carrier Air Wings (CVW)

 Tail codes with a first letter "A" denote Atlantic Fleet airwings, while "N" denotes Pacific Fleet airwings.

Land Based Wings

The Navy's land based aircraft wings either provide deployable combat ready squadrons to Carrier Air Wings or they operate land based aircraft squadrons in various operational or support roles. These wings are generally not assigned Tail Codes. The exceptions are the Training Air Wings, the Navy Reserve's Tactical Support Wing which retains the code "AF" from its former existence as Carrier Air Wing Reserve TWENTY and Electronic Attack Wing, U.S. Pacific Fleet (VAQWINGPAC) which adopted the code "NL" from the disestablished CVW-15 for use by the wing's land based "expeditionary" squadrons only. Squadrons which are assigned to Carrier Air Wings are marked with the tail code of that Carrier Air Wing. Squadrons which do not deploy as part of a Carrier Air Wing are all assigned tail codes unique to each squadron (except for the aforementioned expeditionary VAQ squadrons, training squadrons and the reserve's Tactical Support Wing squadrons). See U.S. Navy and U.S. Marine Corps Aircraft Tail Codes.

Currently Active Type and Functional Wings
There have been numerous Type and Functional Wings throughout the history of the U. S. Navy. Type and Functional Wings have been established, disestablished or re-designated as the Navy has operated different aircraft through the years.  The tables below list the Type and Functional Wings which are active as of January 2023.

Disestablished Type and Functional Wings
Included in the tables of disestablished wings below are no longer used former designations of disestablished or currently active wings. For example the current Patrol and Reconnaissance Wing ELEVEN was established in August 1942 as Patrol Wing 11, it was re-designated Fleet Air Wing 11 in November of that year, re-designated back to Patrol Wing ELEVEN in 1973 and finally to the current designation of Patrol and Reconnaissance Wing ELEVEN in 1999. Patrol Wing 11 and Fleet Air Wing 11 are not disestablished wings, they are formerly used designations of the current Patrol and Reconnaissance Wing ELEVEN. Similarly the currently active Helicopter Maritime Strike Wing Atlantic Fleet (HSMWINGLANT) was previously designated Helicopter Anti-Submarine (Light) Wing Atlantic Fleet (HSLWINGLANT),  before that it was designated Helicopter Anti-Submarine (Light) Wing ONE (HSLWING ONE) and before that it was designated Helicopter Sea Control Wing THREE (HELSEACONWING THREE). HELSEACONWING THREE, HSLWING ONE and HSLWINGLANT are not disestablished wings as the wing still exists as HSMWINGLANT, they are former designations of the currently active wing which are no longer used.

Disestablished Fleet Air Wings, Patrol Wings and Patrol and Reconnaissance Wings
Patrol Wings/Fleet Air Wings/Patrol and Reconnaissance Wings controlled squadrons of large land based bomber or patrol or other non ship based aircraft including amphibious or float planes. Note: the parenthetical (1st) and (2nd) appended to some Fleet Air Wing and Patrol Wing designations below are not a part of the wing's designation. They are added to indicate that the designation was used more than one time during the history of U.S. Naval Aviation and to specify which use of the designation is indicated. There is not necessarily any connection between Fleet Air Wings and/or Patrol Wings which shared the same designation.

Disestablished Fleet Airship Wings
Fleet Airship Wings (FASW) were created to operate the large airship force that the Navy created in WWII. The Navy operated airships prior to the war but individual airships were assigned to airship stations, the airship force was not organized into squadrons and wings until WWII. Note: the parenthetical (1st) and (2nd) appended to the two FASW 1 entries are not a part of either wing's designation. They are added to indicate that the FASW 1 designation was used to designate two separate unrelated wings, the first was a WWII wing and the second was created after the war to operate the Navy's postwar lighter-than-air fleet.

Disestablished Training Air Wings
Training Air Wings were established in 1971 and 1972. Prior to their establishment, Navy, Marine Corps and Coast Guard flight training was conducted by Training Squadrons organized under the Flag Officers "Chief of Naval Air Basic Training" and "Chief of Naval Air Advanced Training" which were aligned under the "Chief of Naval Air Training". Eight Training Air Wings were established, each under the command of a Captain who reported directly to the Chief of Naval Air Training eliminating the positions of Chief of Naval Air Basic Training and Chief of Naval Air Advanced Training.

Disestablished other Type and Functional Wings
Unlike today with the Navy’s Carrier Air Wing squadrons each assigned to two different wings; to a Carrier Air Wing (CVW) for operational employment when deployed and preparing for deployment, and administratively to a Type Wing for “man, train and equip” functions in order to be able to deploy, before 1970 carrier air wing squadrons when not deployed fell under various “Fleet Air” organizations (Fleet Air San Diego, Fleet Air Whidbey, Fleet Air Lemoore…) located at the various Naval Air Stations at which the squadrons were based. These Fleet Air organizations were large, under the command of a Flag Officer and were responsible for the squadrons based at a specific Naval Air Station regardless of the type of aircraft each squadron operated. In the 1950s when the Navy began putting nuclear bombers (Heavy Attack Squadron – VAH) detachments on carriers it formed “Heavy Attack Wings” which reported to their respective "Fleet Air" organization to ensure these crews and aircraft received the specialized training and upkeep required for the safe and effective conduct of this specialized mission. Similarly, the emerging specialized Carrier Airborne Early Warning (VAW) and Tactical Electronic Warfare (VAQ) squadrons were organized into wings under the Fleet Air organizations where they were based. CAEWWINGs 11 & 12 and VAQWING 13 ensured their squadrons’ aircraft and crews were ready and capable of executing their unique roles when attached to their Carrier Air Groups, later Carrier Air Wings, for deployment.

From 1970 to 1973 the Navy reorganized for the “man, train and equip” functions of its CVW aircraft squadrons by establishing wings to replace the “Fleet Air” organizations.  The Pacific and Atlantic Fleets went about the reorganization differently, with the Pacific Fleet opting for a Functional Wing organization and the Atlantic Fleet for a Type Wing organization. In the Pacific Fleet the “Fleet Air” organizations were essentially renamed as wings: At NAS Whidbey Island VAQWING 13 was disestablished and its Tactical Electronic Warfare (VAQ) squadrons combined with the medium attack (VA) squadrons there to form MATVAQWINGPAC which replaced Fleet Air Whidbey; At NAS Miramar CAEWWING 11 was disestablished and all of Fleet Air Miramar's Airborne Early Warning (VAW) squadrons and Fighter (VF) squadrons reported directly to FITAEWWINGPAC; In San Diego ASWWINGPAC replaced Fleet Air San Diego to oversee all ASW helicopter and fixed wing squadrons based there (the few logistics squadrons in San Diego were included in the wing as well); and at NAS Lemoore, Fleet Air Lemoore was replaced by LATWINGPAC with all Pacific Fleet Light Attack (VA) squadrons. These Pacific Fleet wings were all commanded by Flag Officers as had been the former Fleet Air organizations. In the Atlantic Fleet the two already existing type wings, CAEWWING 12 and RECONATKWING ONE were joined by the newly established LATWING ONE, FITWING ONE, MATWING ONE, AIRANTISUBWING ONE, HELANTISUBWING ONE, and HELSEACONWING ONE and all its Fleet Air organizations were eliminated. CAEWWING 12 was not renamed so there was no CAEWWING ONE. Each of these wings was responsible for a single type/model aircraft and each was commanded by a Captain.

In 1993 the Pacific Fleet adopted the Atlantic Fleet’s Type Wing organization breaking up its large functional wings into their component Type Wing parts. At the same time the Atlantic Fleet went about renaming its type wings removing the “One” from the title replacing it with “LANT” (meaning "Atlantic") resulting in uniform type wing designations across the two fleets with wings titled AEWWINGLANT & AEWWINGPAC and HSWINGLANT & HSWINGPAC etc…

See also
List of United States Navy aircraft squadrons
List of inactive United States Navy aircraft squadrons

Notes

References
Roy A. Grossnick (ed.), United States Naval Aviation 1910–1995, 

Aircraft wings list
Navy aircraft wings